The Abbeville massacre (French: Massacre d'Abbeville, Dutch: Bloedbad van Abbeville) took place during World War II on 20 May 1940 in the city of Abbeville, France.

Background
During the German invasion of Belgium, the Belgian authorities arrested a number of suspects ("enemy Belgians and enemy foreigners") between 10 and 15 May on the orders of the auditor general Walter Ganshof van der Meersch. "It is clear that the arrests were very irresponsible and arbitrary. They just picked up some people: out of revenge, out of jealousy, because of their political beliefs, their Jewish origin or because of their foreign nationality," wrote survivor Gaby Warris. These administrative internees were imprisoned in 't Pandreitje, the former prison of Bruges. Among them were Joris Van Severen, Léon Degrelle and other notables. Despite unsuccessful attempts by befriended members of parliament to free Van Severen (as they had VNV leader Staf Declercq), he was deported to France on 15 May 1940 with Degrelle and 77 others. 

Unlike the other suspects who were taken away in so-called "ghost trains", this mixed group (handcuffed in pairs) was driven in three buses via Ostend to Dunkirk, where Degrelle was removed from the group. In the study Dossier Abbeville, the backgrounds of all 'suspicious' persons were extensively discussed. The 21 Belgians also included the Rexist René Wéry, Verdinaso member Jan Rijckoort (the right-hand man of Van Severen) and VNV member Maurits Van Gijsegem. The group also included 18 Jews, 14 German citizens, four Italians (Ferrucio Bellumat, Luigi Lazarelli, Guiseppe Mantella, and Mirko Taccardi), two Dutchmen (Willem van de Loo and Johannes van der Plas), Canadian ice hockey coach Bobby Bell, and a number of Belgian communists (Louis Caestecker and Lucien Monami, among others).

Massacre
Three days later, on 19 May, the entire group was taken to Abbeville and locked up under the music kiosk on the market square. When the city of Abbeville was heavily bombed from the air by German squadrons on the night of 19 to 20 May, the French guards thought that the prisoners would be liberated by the Germans. They decided in the afternoon of 20 May that it was better to execute them. Twenty-one prisoners were taken from the kiosk, placed against the wall, and shot without trial on the orders of the French Capitaine Marcel Dingeon, who was Abbeville's deputy commander. A woman, Maria Geerolf-Ceuterick, was bayoneted to death. She had been mistakenly arrested instead of her son-in-law, the Dutch architect Ernst Warris, who lived in Bruges. The executions ended on orders of Lieutenant Jean Leclabart, who finally arrived and was able to stop the massacre. Among the 21 victims were citizens of six different countries besides Belgium, including Italy, Czechoslovakia (Léon Hirschfeld, a Jewish schizophreniac) and Hungary (Miguel Sonin-Garfunkel, an elderly Spanish Jew).

Of the dead, only four had actually worked for the Germans. Paul Günther (German) was an Abwehr recruiter, while Jean-Henri De Bruyn and Hector Vanderkelen (both Belgian), and René Wéry worked for the Abwehr.

Aftermath
In January 1942, Lieutenant René Caron and Sergeant Émile Molet were put on trial before the German court-martial in wartime Paris. They were sentenced to the death and executed on 7 April 1942 at Mont-Valérien. Captain Marcel Dingeon had escaped to the zone libre, where he had committed suicide in Pau on 21 January 1941.

See also
 Allied war crimes during World War II
 Belgium in World War II
 France during World War II

References

Battle of Belgium
Conflicts in 1940
1940 murders in France
Massacres in France
Massacres committed by France
May 1940 events
Anti-communism in France
Antisemitism in France
World War II prisoner of war massacres
World War II crimes by the Allies